The 1975–76 Ranji Trophy was the 42nd season of the Ranji Trophy. Bombay retained the title defeating Bihar.

Highlights

 A 16 year old Kapil Dev made his first class debut for Haryana against Punjab taking 6 for 39 and 2 for 78.

Group stage

West Zone

South Zone

Central Zone

North Zone

East Zone

Knockout stage

Final

Scorecards and averages
Cricketarchive

References

External links

1976 in Indian cricket
Domestic cricket competitions in 1975–76
Ranji Trophy seasons